Don Argott (born September 14, 1972) is an American documentary filmmaker and musician.  He has directed several documentary films and has also worked as a producer and cinematographer.  He co-owns the production company 9.14 Pictures with producer Sheena M. Joyce.

Biography
Originally from Pequannock Township, New Jersey, Argott currently resides in Philadelphia, Pennsylvania.

He has worked with film score in a rock band format, releasing original music under the name Pornosonic.  Pornosonic's work has been featured in numerous films, including Old School.  Argott currently plays guitar in the proto-metal band Serpent Throne along with 9.14 Pictures editor Demian Fenton.

Filmography
Rock School (2005)
Two Days in April (2007)
The Art of the Steal (2009)
Last Days Here (2011) (co-directed with Demian Fenton)
The Atomic States of America (2012, co-directed with Sheena M. Joyce)
Slow Learners (2015, co-directed with Sheena M. Joyce)
Lamb of God - As The Palaces Burn Documentary (2014)
Batman & Bill (2017, co-directed with Sheena M. Joyce)

References

External links

9.14 Pictures official website
Serpent Throne at MySpace
Pornosonic at MySpace

1972 births
Living people
People from Pequannock Township, New Jersey
Film directors from New Jersey